Reed Mahoney (born 22 April 1998) is an Australian professional rugby league footballer who plays as  for the Canterbury-Bankstown Bulldogs in the NRL. He is the on-field Co-Captain of the club alongside Matt Burton.

He has played for the Prime Minister's XIII. He previously played for the Parramatta Eels in the National Rugby League.

Early life
Mahoney was born in Nambour, Queensland, Australia.

Playing career
Mahoney started his football in Queensland, playing for the Kawana Dolphins and Beerwah Bulldogs as junior. Before being scouted by the Canterbury-Bankstown Bulldogs for their SG ball team.  After playing for Canterbury's Under 20's side, Mahoney was released by the club midway through the year after Canterbury declared he would never play first grade and rejected the offer of $1500 to keep him.

In 2017, he was signed by the Parramatta Eels until the end of 2018 on a $6000 contract. He played in 28 games in 2017 NYC tournament, primarily playing off the bench as a second hooker before obtaining a starting role towards the end of the year. Mahoney led the NYC in tackles and helped Parramatta make the Grand Final. He was awarded the Steve Ella medal for Parramatta under 20s player of the year.

2018
In 2018, still eligible for under 20s, Mahoney shifted to Intrust Super Premiership team Wentworthville, playing 5 games. On 9 June 2018 rd 14, Mahoney made his NRL debut for Parramatta against the North Queensland Cowboys at TIO Stadium in Darwin. The following week, Mahoney was placed on report and suspended for one match after being cited for a dangerous tackle in Parramatta's 42-24 loss against Souths.

On 11 July 2018, Mahoney was named in Queensland's under 20s team in their 30-6 win over New South Wales. Mahoney had 2 try assists in the game. Due to injury, Mahoney was made the starter at hooker for the remaining five games of the 2018 season, expressing his desire to re-sign with Parramatta. On 26 February 2019, Mahoney re-signed with Parramatta until the end of the 2020 season.

2019
On 22 April 2019, Mahoney scored a try on his 21st birthday as Parramatta defeated Wests Tigers 51-6 in the opening NRL game at the new Western Sydney Stadium.

Mahoney made 26 appearances for Parramatta in the 2019 NRL season as the club finished 5th on the table and qualified for the finals.  Mahoney played in both finals game for Parramatta in which they defeated Brisbane 58-0 in the elimination final at the Western Sydney Stadium.  The following week, Parramatta were defeated by Melbourne 32-0 in the elimination semi final at AAMI Park.  During the first half of the game, Mahoney was pinned to the ground by Melbourne player Cameron Smith and slapped twice across the face earning the Melbourne player a rare trip to the sin bin.

On 30 September, Mahoney earned his first representative jersey as he was named on the bench for the Australia PM XIII side. On 7 October, Mahoney was named at hooker for the U23 Junior Australian side.

2020
Mahoney scored the first try of the 2020 NRL season as Parramatta defeated arch rivals Canterbury-Bankstown 8-2 at Western Sydney Stadium.

On July 14, Mahoney re-signed with Parramatta until 2022.

Mahoney played a total of 21 games for Parramatta in the 2020 NRL season as the club finished third on the table.  Mahoney played in both finals games for the club as they were once again eliminated in the second week.

2021
On 31 May, Mahoney was selected by Queensland for game one of the 2021 State of Origin series.

On 1 June, Mahoney was released from the Queensland camp and subsequently named in Parramatta's round 13 match against Newcastle.

In round 21, Mahoney was taken from the field with a shoulder injury in Parramatta's 40-12 loss against South Sydney.  Mahoney had previously injured the same shoulder weeks earlier and had missed a few matches as a result.  On 7 August, it was confirmed that Mahoney would be ruled out for the rest of the 2021 NRL season.

On 25 November, Mahoney signed a four-year deal to join Parramatta's arch-rivals the Canterbury-Bankstown Bulldogs on a four-year deal worth $2.4 million.  Parramatta had initially offered Mahoney a two-year contract worth $900K but then upgraded a final offer of $1.5 million over three seasons.

2022
In round 20 of the 2022 NRL season, Mahoney scored two tries for Parramatta in a 34-10 victory over Penrith.
Mahoney played 28 games for Parramatta throughout 2022 including the clubs Grand Final loss to Penrith.

Mahoney commenced pre-season training at Belmore in December.

2023
Mahoney was announced as on field co-captain of Canterbury for the 2023 season alongside Matt Burton. 

Mahoney played in a trial match against the Canberra Raiders in Moruya, New South Wales, winning 34-18 and playing a key role in his 26 minute stint, setting up two tries and exerting a strong influence around the ruck.
In round 1 of the 2023 NRL season, he made his club debut for Canterbury in their 31-6 loss against Manly at Brookvale Oval.

References

External links
Parramatta Eels profile
Information
Wentworthville Magpies profile
Information
Information

1998 births
Living people
Australian rugby league players
Parramatta Eels players
Canterbury-Bankstown Bulldogs players
Rugby league hookers
Rugby league players from Nambour, Queensland
Wentworthville Magpies players